Llandderfel is a village and a sparsely populated community in Gwynedd, Wales, near Bala, formerly served by the Llandderfel railway station. The community also includes the settlements of Glan-yr-afon, Llanfor, Cefnddwysarn and Frongoch. The Community population taken at the 2011 census was 1,095.

Palé Hall
Palé Hall was built in 1871, on the site of an older manor house in Llandderfel. It was designed by Samuel Pountney Smith of Shrewsbury for Henry Robertson MP, a railway engineer and local landowner. The house was used as a military hospital in World War I and a home for evacuated children in World War II. The Robertson family  sold the estate to the Duke of Westminster in the 1950s.

The church of St Derfel
The parish church of Llandderfel (Saint Dervel) is part of the diocese of St Asaph and is mentioned in the Papal Registers of the late 15th century. The poet Dewi Havhesp is buried at Llandderfel church yard. There are sheep that graze in the church yard.

A Celtic Llan site, founded in the early 6th century by Saint Derfel, the church was rebuilt probably in the early 16th century. A large wooden image of the saint was sent to London in 1538 and burned with John Forest in Smithfield, however the now headless carved red stag and staff are still preserved within the porch.

Governance
An electoral ward in the same name exists. This ward stretches beyond the confines of Llandderfel with a population taken at the 2011 census of 1,511.

Notable people
Huw Cae Llwyd (born about 1431 – died after 1505), poet
Edward Jones (1752–1824), harpist.
Dewi Havhesp (1831–1884), poet, noted especially for his englynion. 
Huw Derfel (1816–1890), author of the first mountain handbook in Welsh.
Robert Jones Derfel (1824–1905), patriotic poet and early Socialist.
Rees Davies (1938–2005), Chichelle Professor of Medieval History

References

External links

Three Saints, Two Wells & a Welsh Parish by Tristan Gray Hulse, Living Spring Journal, Issue 6 (Summer 1998)
St Derfel and the Stag – icon or idol?, by Dr Madeleine Gray, WalesOnline, 2 May 2013